Glycidic acid is an organic compound that has both epoxide and carboxylic acid functions. It may be prepared by the oxidation of glycidol, or by the epoxidation of acrylic acid. This compound is commercially available as well.

See also
 Glycidamide

References

Carboxylic acids
Epoxides